The Bachelier model is a model of an asset price under brownian motion presented by Louis Bachelier on his PhD thesis The Theory of Speculation (Théorie de la spéculation, published 1900). It is also called "Normal Model" equivalently (as opposed to "Log-Normal Model" or "Black-Scholes Model").  

On April 8 2020, the CME Group posted the note CME Clearing Plan to Address the Potential of a Negative Underlying in Certain Energy Options Contracts, saying that after a threshold on price, it would change its standard energy options model from one based on Geometric Brownian Motion and the Black–Scholes model to the Bachelier model. On April 20 2020, oil futures reached negative values for the first time in history, where Bachelier model took an important role in option pricing and risk management. 

The European analytic formula for this model based on a risk neutral argument is derived in Analytic Formula for the European Normal Black Scholes Formula (Kazuhiro Iwasawa, New York University, December 2nd, 2001). 

The implied volatility under the Bachelier model can be obtained by an accurate numerical approximation.

For an extensive review of the Bachelier model, see the review paper, A Black-Scholes User's Guide to the Bachelier Model , which summarizes the results on volatility conversion, risk management, stochastic volatility, and barrier options pricing to facilitate the model transition. The paper also connects the Black-Scholes and Bachelier models by using the displaced Black-Scholes model as a model family.

References

Energy economics
Finance theories
Financial models
Options (finance)